Deus Ex is a series of role-playing video games, set during the mid 21st century. Focusing on the conflict between secretive factions who wish to control the world by proxy, and the effects of transhumanistic attitudes and technologies in a dystopian near-future setting, the series also includes references to real-world conspiracy theories, historical mythologies and philosophies, and provides a commentary on capitalist values and division in society. The first two games in the series were developed by Ion Storm, and subsequent entries were developed by Eidos-Montréal, following Ion Storm's closure. The Ion Storm games were published by Eidos Interactive, and all Eidos-Montréal media was published by Square Enix until 2022, when ownership was sold to Embracer Group.

The series consists of six games: Deus Ex (2000), Deus Ex: Invisible War (2003), Deus Ex: Human Revolution (2011), Deus Ex: The Fall (2013),  Deus Ex Go (2016) and Deus Ex: Mankind Divided (2016). The series has been generally well-received by critics and sold over 14 million units worldwide.

Series overview

Note: given the freedom of choice found within each game, the section below only gives the general outline of the world and the individual plotlines.

While each game has a distinct story, they are all set within the same world: an Earth of the future which has evolved into a dystopian cyberpunk society. In this setting, several organizations compete for overall control of the world. Several of the societies mentioned or shown are inspired by real-world and invented secret societies and conspiracy theories. The one constant through the series is the Illuminati, although FEMA, Majestic 12, and the Knights Templar are also featured. The main characters in the series possess artificially acquired superhuman abilities, referred to as "Augmentation."

Deus Ex takes place during 2052, while the world is facing a crisis caused by a mysterious nano-virus called the Gray Death. In the midst of the crisis, JC Denton, a nano-augmented rookie agent for the United Nations Anti-Terrorist Coalition (UNATCO), is sent to eliminate terrorist cells, but ends up drawn into the various schemes of rival factions and secret societies, who are responsible for the epidemic. Once he arrives in Area 51, Denton has the choice between neutralizing technology and plunging the world into a second dark age, allying with the Illuminati, or merging with an advanced AI so as to impose a benevolent dictatorship. Invisible War takes place twenty years later, after a massive economic depression and period of war called the Collapse that was indicated by Denton's actions and a combination of possible events from the first game. The game's protagonist, Alex D, a clone of Denton, is drawn into a conflict between two seemingly opposing factions, and learns of conspiratorial factions which seek to drastically change the world, including JC Denton: Alex can perform missions for any of them, and eventually becomes able to choose which organization should rule the world.

Human Revolution is set in 2027, twenty-five years before the first title, where corporations have extended their influence past the reach of global governments and the development of bio-mechanical augmentation by a few elite and powerful companies threatens to destabilize society. The game follows Adam Jensen, the security chief for bio-tech company Sarif Industries. After a devastating attack on Sarif's headquarters which leaves him near-death, Adam is forced to undergo radical augmentation surgery, and he becomes embroiled both in the search for the attackers and the political and ethical repercussions of augmentation technology. The Fall is a parallel story, set after the spin-off novel Icarus Effect. It follows the story of Ben Saxon, an augmented former British SAS mercenary, who is on the run from his former employers, a group of augmented mercenaries that play a crucial part in the plot of Human Revolution. Mankind Divided is set in 2029, two years after the events of Human Revolution in a world dealing with the consequences of the previous game's events. Regardless of the choice made by Adam at the end of Human Revolution, the Illuminati have twisted his message and augmented individuals are persecuted and feared. A disillusioned Adam works with an international taskforce (hinted to be a precursor to UNATCO in Deus Ex) designed to stop the rising wave of terrorism brought on by the disenfranchised and desperate augmented while working to uncover the perpetrators of the events that led to the current state of the world.

Gameplay
A unifying element across the series is the combination of gameplay styles from several different genres, including action role-playing, first-person shooter and stealth. Role-playing elements are mostly linked to augmenting the character in a specific way, spending skill points to create characters that can be focused either on stealth or combat, or a balance of the two. Player choice is a key feature of the series, with the actions of the player character affecting both the world around them and the way non-player characters (NPCs) react to the character: depending on which faction they belong to, NPCs might praise and be helpful, chastise, ignore, or even attack them. This emphasis on player choice is most evident in Invisible War, where players can choose the gender and skin color of the main character before starting, and have the option of running quests for and allying with four possible factions within the game.

Development history

The original Deus Ex was conceived by Warren Spector in 1994 under the working title Troubleshooter. The main drive behind Deus Ex was Spector's growing dislike for straight fantasy or science fiction video games, and the want to create something new and different. In an interview, he stated that he wanted to emulate the immersive playing styles of games like Ultima Underworld. Eventually, after being rejected by both Origin Systems (the company he was working with at the time) and Looking Glass Studios, Spector's project was picked up by Ion Storm. According to Spector, they asked him to "make the game of [his] dreams". The title Deus Ex was meant to both represent aspects of the plot in the game and to poke fun at the design techniques that were prevalent in the majority of games at the time. The game's influences included Suikoden, Half-Life and GoldenEye 007.

The second game in the series, Invisible War, was unveiled at E3 2002. The designers chose to allow the players to choose which sex their player character would be, an idea conceived for the original game. After the release of Invisible War, Ion Storm started pre-production for a Deus Ex prequel twice but neither came to fruition. This period saw both Harvey Smith, the main designer for Deus Ex, and Spector leaving Ion Storm in 2004, with the former citing health problems and the latter saying he wished to pursue his own projects. Later, because of restructuring at Eidos Interactive, Ion Storm was closed down the following year. A multiplayer-focused third game titled Deus Ex: Clan Wars was originally being made at Crystal Dynamics, but because of the commercial underperformance of  Invisible War, it was distanced from the Deus Ex series and renamed Project Snowblind.

Human Revolution was announced in 2007 under the working title Deus Ex 3. The game's creation was handled by Eidos-Montréal and the developer's parent company Square Enix, whose Visual Works department created the CG movies for the game. The game became the first entry in the series to receive downloadable content in the form of The Missing Link, an extra episode designed to fill a narrative gap in the game. 

The Fall was announced in 2013, for iPhone and iPad. Set within Human Revolutions timeframe, the game was created by the previous game's core team and a team from mobile phone developer N-Fusion. 

Mankind Divided was announced in 2013 (untitled at the time) when Eidos-Montréal announced that they were working on a new title in the series for PC and next-gen platforms, and that it would be the first part of a larger, transmedia project called Deus Ex: Universe. It would be revealed in 2015 with its official name accompanied by an announcement trailer. In January 2017, it was reported that a planned sequel to Mankind Divided was cancelled.

Jason Schreier of Bloomberg News reported in November 2022 that Eidos-Montréal was in the "very very early" development stages of a new Deus Ex game.

Related media

CBS Films has acquired screen rights to Deus Ex, after Eidos was purchased by Square Enix. An announcement was made for a film adaptation of Deus Ex: Human Revolution in July 2012.

In 2015, Adrian Askarieh, producer of the Hitman films, stated that he hoped to oversee a shared universe of Square Enix films with Just Cause, Hitman, Tomb Raider, Deus Ex, and Thief, but admitted that he does not have the rights to Tomb Raider. In May 2017, the Game Central reporters at Metro UK suggested that the shared universe was unlikely, pointing out that no progress had been made on any Just Cause, Deus Ex nor Thief films.

Human Revolution inspired a tie-in comic book, a spin-off novel, and action figures. Alongside the announcement of a next-gen entry in the franchise, Eidos-Montréal announced Deus Ex: Universe, a multimedial project involving video games across all platforms, books, graphic novels and other unspecified mediums.

Deus Ex Go is a mobile game for iOS and Android systems developed by Square Enix Montréal, released in 2016. It is a puzzle-based game in the same fashion as Square Enix Montréal's previous mobile titles, Hitman Go and Lara Croft Go.

Reception

Overall, the Deus Ex series has been generally well-received by critics, with the games' storylines and freedom of choice being the main point of praise.

The first game won multiple awards from various video game publications, and was lauded by critics at the time, although its graphics came in for some criticism.

Invisible War was also well received, but did not enjoy the success of its predecessor, with many elements of its gameplay and story being targets for criticism, but many praising its branching gameplay and the high level of paths the player could take through the story.

Human Revolution received high critical praise, with many reviewers praising the open-ended nature of the game and the weight of social interaction on the outcome of events.

The Fall was more mixed to negative, with praise going to the game's attempt to bring the Deus Ex universe to a portable platform, but many other aspects coming in for both praise and criticism. The PC version was criticized for being a bad mobile-to-computer port.

Sales
Sales as of September 2011:
Deus Ex: 1.1 million plus
Deus Ex: Invisible War: 1.2 million plus
Deus Ex: Human Revolution: 2.18 million

As of May 2022, Deus Ex: Human Revolution, Deus Ex: Human Revolution - Director's Cut, and Deus Ex: Mankind Divided have sold over 12 million units combined.

References

External links

 
Action role-playing video games
Cyberpunk video games
Cyberpunk
Postcyberpunk
Brain–computer interfacing in fiction
Video games about cyborgs
Video games adapted into comics
Cyborgs in fiction
Prosthetics in fiction
Transhumanism in fiction
Dystopian video games
First-person shooters
Video games about genetic engineering
Science fiction video games
Stealth video games
Works about conspiracy theories
Works about the Illuminati
Video game franchises introduced in 2000
Transhumanism in video games
Embracer Group franchises
Alternate history video games